Carl Hahn (1926–2023) was the Chairman of the Volkswagen Group (1982–1993).

Carl Hahn may also refer to:

Carl Hugo Hahn (1818–1895), German missionary and linguist
Carl Wilhelm Hahn (1786–1835), German zoologist
William Hahn (born Carl Wilhelm Hahn, 1829–1887), German painter